Rustam-i-Zaman was the title of a Bijapuri general who commanded Adil Shah's 10,000 strong army, in the Battle of Kolhapur against Shivaji's forces. He also was the son of Ranadulla Khan (who also held the title Rustam-i-Zaman), an experienced and senior general of Bijapur and the chief mentor and guardian of Shahaji.

He participated in the war against the Marathas under Afzal Khan. He was routed but he was allowed to go back to Bijapur by Noor Khan Beg and Tanaji Malusare, military commanders of Shivaji.

He led the 10,000 strong Bijapuri army against the 3500 light cavalry of Marathas. Due to the superior use of flanks by Shivaji, the Marathas won the battle and Rustam Zaman and Fazal Khan fled to Bijapur.

References 

Indian generals
Year of death unknown
Year of birth unknown